Nakhon Ratchasima is a city in Thailand

Nakhon Ratchasima may also refer to
Nakhon Ratchasima Province, the province of the city.
Amphoe Mueang Nakhon Ratchasima, the Mueang Nakhon Ratchasima district
Diocese of Nakhon Ratchasima, the Roman Catholic Diocese
Nakhon Ratchasima Airport
Monthon Nakhon Ratchasima, a former administrative entity